Starstruck is a 1998 American comedy drama film written and directed by John Embom and starring Jamie Kennedy and Loren Dean.

Premise 
A temp/aspiring screenwriter in Los Angeles befriends a washed up, former teen idol and develops an unhealthy relationship with him.

Cast
 Jamie Kennedy as George Gordon Flynn
 Loren Dean as Kyle Carey
 Bridgette Wilson as Sandra
 Spencer Garrett as Philip
 Bruce Ramsay as Manny
 Carmen Electra as Iona Shirley
 Amy Smart as Tracey Beck
 Clarence Williams III as Jarry Wallace
 Marlo Thomas as Linda Phaeffle
 Paul Herman as Saul Spengler

Reception 
From Nathan Rabin at The A.V. Club:

References

External links 
 
 
 

1998 films
Films shot in Los Angeles
American independent films
Films scored by Christophe Beck
1998 comedy-drama films
Films produced by Beau Flynn
1998 independent films
1990s English-language films
1990s American films
American comedy-drama films